Nenad Vučković may refer to:

 Nenad Vučković (footballer) (born 1976), Croatian footballer
 Nenad Vučković (handballer) (born 1980), Serbian handball player